The Men's C-1 200 metres event at the 2015 Southeast Asian Games took place on 9 June 2015 at Marina Channel.

There will be 7 competitors representing 7 countries set to take part in this event.

Schedule
All times are Singapore Standard Time (UTC+08:00)

Start list

Results

Final 
{| class="wikitable sortable" style="text-align:center"
!width=40|Rank
!width=40|Lane
!width=250|Athlete
!width=80|Time
 |}

References

External links
SEA Games 2015 - Canoeing Sport Schedule

Canoeing at the 2015 Southeast Asian Games